The Costești-Cetățuie Dacian fortress was a Dacian fortified town. Located near Costești village, Hunedoara County, Romania, it belongs to the Dacian Fortresses of the Orăștie Mountains World Heritage Site. The fortress was built in the 1st century BC, during Burebista's rule, with the purpose of defending the area against the Romans.

Information about the fortress
The site is located in the river valley of Apa Grădiștei. The superior plateau of the hill where it is situated is 514 m above sea level. It was a strong fortress which had a defensive role. Apparently, it had a civilian settlement at the base and it was the regular residence of the Dacian kings. Another important role was the guarding of the road to Sarmizegetusa Regia.

Gallery

References

External links
Cetățile dacice din Munții Orăștiei - Costești-Cetățuie

Dacian towns
Dacian fortresses of the Orăștie Mountains
Dacian fortresses in Hunedoara County
Tourist attractions in Hunedoara County
Historic monuments in Hunedoara County
Ancient history of Transylvania